Abdullah Al-Tamimi (Arabic:عبدالله التميمي) (born 2 March 1993) is an Emirati footballer. He currently plays for Al Nasr as a goalkeeper .

External links

References

Emirati footballers
1993 births
Living people
Al-Nasr SC (Dubai) players
Fujairah FC players
Place of birth missing (living people)
UAE Pro League players
Association football goalkeepers